Ninaithale Inikkum is a 1979 Indian Tamil-language romantic comedy film directed by K. Balachander starring Kamal Haasan, Rajinikanth, Jaya Prada and Geetha. The story was written by Sujatha. The film was also simultaneously shot in Telugu as Andamaina Anubhavam. A large part of the film was shot in Singapore. The film was later dubbed in Hindi as Pyara Tarana.

Plot 

Sona, a daughter of a Singapore business man misses her money and other valuables during her visit to India. A smuggler comes forward to help her and assigns her a smuggling related job. Hence Sona pretends to be a fan of singer Chandru and meets him in the hotel. She keeps a diamond inside Chandru's guitar and leaves the room. Next day Chandru's troupe leaves for Singapore. Coincidentally, Chandru forgot to take that particular guitar with him. Sona also travels in the same flight and becomes closer to Chandru. Even though her intention was to get the diamond from Chandru, she starts loving Chandru. However she hesitates in conveying her love since she knows that her early death due to blood cancer is inevitable. The smuggler tortures her since the diamond was lost. Due to her circumstances, she is unable to keep her words and Chandru thinks that Sona is a cheat and fraud. Chandru's troupe returns to India. The smuggler feels pity for Sona and allows her to leave for India. Sona enters Chandru's house to Chandru's surprise. Chandru realizes that Sona is not a cheat and fraud. In spite of his mother's opposition and her terminal illness, Chandru marries Sona. Sona spends her remaining short life along with Chandru's troupe. Finally Sona passes away and Chandru decides to be a widower throughout his life.

Cast 
 Kamal Haasan as Chandru
 Rajinikanth as Deepak
 Jaya Prada as Sona
 Jayasudha as Kamini
 Geetha as Meena
 S. K. Misro as Kamalakar Rao/Mama
 Sarath Babu (Guest appearance)
 Narayana Rao (Guest appearance)
 S. Ve. Shekher as radio operator (Guest appearance)
 Poornam Viswanathan as Sona's father

Production 
Many of K. Balachander's students like Jayasudha, Sarath Babu, Geetha and Narayana Rao appear in cameo for their mentor. This was the debut film for actor S. Ve. Shekher. Jayasudha's sister Subhashini also appears. The band in the film and the music were inspired by the Beatles.

A large portion of the film was shot in Singapore, while additional scenes were shot at the AVM Garden Villa, Chennai. The scene where Deepak (Rajinikanth) is challenged to flip his cigarette 10 times or lose a finger is based on Roald Dahl's Man from the South.

Soundtrack 
The soundtrack was composed by M. S. Viswanathan while the Tamil lyrics were written by Kannadasan. The disco song "Engeyum Eppothum" was remixed by Yogi B in Pollathavan (2007). The song "Sambo Siva Sambo" was remixed by Vijay Antony as "Avala Nambithan" for Salim (2014). Sudha Ragunathan noted that "Ninaithale Inikkum just rocked the scene with MSV Sir bringing out his innovative streaks."

Release and reception 
Ninaithale Inikkum was released on 14 April 1979, and Andamaina Anubhavam on 19 April. Piousji of Sunday wrote, "despite heroic efforts by Kamalahasan to save the film, it disintegrates fast." P. S. M. of Kalki appreciated performances of Rajinikanth and Kamal Haasan, Lokanath's cinematography and Balachander's direction felt Balachander made a film without a strong plot and called it just like that entertaining film. Lokanath won Tamil Nadu State Film Award for Best Cinematographer.

Legacy 
The 2011 film Engaeyum Eppothum (2011) was named after the film's song. In 2009, another film called Ninaithale Inikkum was released. Director G. N. R. Kumaravelan stated that the title was "right for my film on students and the college scenario". The line "Jagame Thandhiram" in the song "Sambo Siva Sambo" inspired a 2021 film of the same name.

Abaswaram Ramji conducted a stage show called Ninaithale Inikkum in 2006. A play called Shiva Sambho named after the song "Sambho Siva Sambho" was conducted by Theatre of Maham. M. S. Viswanathan composed the background music for the play.

Re-release 
A digitally restored version of the film was released on 4 October 2013, but received a lukewarm response at the box office.

References

Bibliography

External links 
 
 

1979 multilingual films
1970s musical comedy films
1979 romantic comedy films
1970s Tamil-language films
1970s Telugu-language films
1979 films
Films directed by K. Balachander
Films scored by M. S. Viswanathan
Films shot in Singapore
Films with screenplays by K. Balachander
Indian multilingual films
Indian musical comedy films
Indian romantic comedy films